Sports Kyoushitsu is a Japanese TV program which main theme is to guide how to coach or play sports by NHK. The program began in 1961 and is ongoing.　This program is broadcast every weekend.

List of Sports 
 
Following are the sports broadcast by NHK. (There are more sports left.)

Soccer

Futsal

Baseball

Volleyball

Handball

Tennis

Swimming

How to tape

Soft Tennis

Skating

Judo

Kendo

Karate

Kempo

Volleyball

Badminton

Squash

Table Tennis

Gateball

Softball

Rugby

First Aid

Japanese sports television series